Béla Nyitrai was a male Hungarian international table tennis player.

He won a bronze medal at the 1934 World Table Tennis Championships in the men's doubles with István Boros.

He was of Jewish origin and was a National champion of Hungary.

See also
 List of table tennis players
 List of World Table Tennis Championships medalists

References

Hungarian male table tennis players
World Table Tennis Championships medalists
20th-century Hungarian people